Madhushree (born Sujata Bhattacharya, 2 November 1969) is an Indian playback singer who sings in Hindi, Tamil, Bengali, Kannada and Telugu films. A familiar voice in A. R. Rahman's compositions, Madhushree hails from a musically inclined family, having previously been trained in classical and western styles music. Her father wanted her to be a classical singer, she joined the Rabindra Bharati University and completed her master's degree, but her desire was always to be a playback singer.

Early life 
Madhushree was born as Sujata Bhattacharya in a Bengali family in Kolkata to Amarendranath and Parbati Bhattacharya, who were her initial teachers. She was taught classical music by Sangeetacharya Pt. Amiya Ranjan Bandyopadhyay, a noted exponent of the Bishnupur Gharana and excelled in Thumri and Khayal. Later she started working for the Indian Council for Cultural Relations, through which she was deputed to teach classical music in Suriname.

Career 
Madhushree came to Mumbai to find a break in the playback singing industry. Initially, she recorded her music on CDs and sent it to notable people of Bollywood. One such CD reached Javed Akhtar. On Javed Akhtar's recommendation, she then made her playback singing debut through Rajesh Roshan's Moksha. She has then gone on to sing songs in films like Yuva, Aayitha Ezhuthu, Kal Ho Naa Ho, Ham Hain Ispal Yahan and Kuch Naa Kaho, Tu Bin Bataye, In Lamhon Ke Daaman Me.

She sang three songs in A. R. Rahman's Tehzeeb, for which she has been credited as Sujata Bhattacharya. Madhushree is known for "Kabhi Neem Neem" from Yuva (2004), for which she received the prestigious Sony Stardust Award as the Best Female Sensation (Playback Singer).  She also sang a song 'In Lamhon Ke Daaman Mein' from the movie Jodhaa Akbar, music directed by A. R. Rahman and Soja Zara of Bahubali 2 – The Conclusion ( Nominated for Best Playback Singer by Mirchi Awards-2018). She won the 20th Edition of Lions Gold Award for All Time Film Versatile Playback Singer and the ceremony was held at Bhaidas Hall in Mumbai.

She was a judge on Zee Bangla Saregamapa (2017) with Shantanu Moitra, Kumar Sanu, Jeet Gannguli and Palak Muchhal

Discography

Hindi

Tamil

Telugu

Other languages

Albums 

 Debut Album: Lagi Lagan
Released: 08-08-08
Released by: Royant Music & Big Music
Music by: Robby Badal

Songlist:
"Piya Lagi Laganiya"
"Lagi Lagi"
"Manat Nahi"
"Aye Na Balam"
"Jabse Shyam Sidhare"
"Babul Mora"
"Piya Lagi laganiya" (Video Edit)
"Lagi Lagi" (House Remix)
"Barsan Lagi"

Accolades

References

External links 

 Madhushree's official website
 

Living people
Bengali Hindus
Bengali singers
Bollywood playback singers
Indian women playback singers
Singers from Kolkata
Tamil playback singers
Telugu playback singers
Rabindra Bharati University alumni
1969 births
21st-century Indian singers
21st-century Indian women singers
Women musicians from West Bengal